In numerical analysis, a blossom is a functional that can be applied to any polynomial, but is mostly used for Bézier and spline curves and surfaces.

The blossom of a polynomial ƒ, often denoted   is completely characterised by the three properties:
 It is a symmetric function of its arguments:
 
 (where π is any permutation of its arguments).
 It is affine in each of its arguments:
 
 It satisfies the diagonal property:

References

Numerical analysis